Alexander Pilis is an architectural investigator, working under the aegis of "Architecture Parallax".

Pilis was born in Rio de Janeiro and lives-works in Barcelona, Toronto and São Paulo. Trained as an architect, he has taught at the University of Toronto in the School of Architecture and the Department of Fine Arts for 13 years. He taught the program the Metropolis Masters in Architecture and Urban Culture, a collaborative project between the Centre de Cultura Contemporània de Barcelona and the Pompeu Fabra University.

The Blind Architect: Visual Crisis is an extension, and a summation of his quarter-century of exploration into the nature and meaning of what he calls "Architecture Parallax".  It is a research praxis that poses questions, how to think, articulate, and represent an ordering system that is not dependent upon a visual singularity.

Works

Selected solo exhibitions
2010	WhiteBox@Michael Gibson Gallery, London, Ontario, Canada.
2010	Peak Gallery, Toronto, Ontario, Canada.
2010	Mcmaster Museum of Art, Hamilton, Ontario, Canada.
2006	Pinacoteca do Estado de São Paulo, SP Brazil.
2006	Peak Gallery, Toronto, Ontario, Canada.
2005	ADN, Barcelona Spain.
2003	Museum of Installation, The Modern Tate, Sir John Soane Museum, London Eye, The Old Operating Theater, Laban, Old Greenwich Royal Observatory and in Collaboration with The Metropolitan University of London, Fine Arts department, London UK.
1999	Box 23, Barcelona Spain.
1998	Institut fur Auslandsbeziehungen (I.F.A.), Stuttgart, Germany.
1998	The Gallery, UK.
1996	Akademie Schloss Solitude, Schloss Halle, Stuttgart, Germany.
1995	Chopo Museum, Mexico DF, Mexico.
1994	Winnipeg Art Gallery, Winnipeg, Manitoba, Canada.
1993	YYZ Gallery, Toronto, Ontario, Canada.
1993	Contemporary Museum of Art, São Paulo Brazil.
1992	Western Front Gallery, Vancouver, British Columbia, Canada.
1990	Museu de Arte Contemporanea, São Paulo Brazil.
1988	The Power Plant Art Gallery Toronto, Ontario, Canada.

Guest artist in residence
2005	The Banff Centre For The Arts, Banff, Alberta, Canada
2004	The Banff Centre For The Arts, Banff, Alberta, Canada.
1998	Guernsey College of Art & Design, UK.
1996–07 Akademie Schloss Solitude, Stuttgart, Germany.
1994	The Banff Centre For The Arts, Banff, Alberta, Canada.

International biennial
2008   28th São Paulo Biennial, SP, Brazil. Architecture Parallax Appear-Disappear.
2002	25Th.  International Art-Architecture Biennial, São Paulo Brazil. Architecture Parallax Visual Crisis, Film/Video/Audio Departments. Canada Council.
1987	19Th.  São Paulo Biennial, São Paulo Brazil. Theoretical Projections

Curatorial
2009	MASP SP Brazil and Instituto of Architecture Milan Italy.
2003	La Caixa Fundació Forum, Barcelona Spain.
1996	Crises of Abstraction, co-curator with Ihor Holubizky, S.S.: Stuttgart, Germany
1996	Architecture Parallax SnackLunch, St. Norbert Arts & Cultural Centre, Winnipeg, Manitoba, Canada.
1995	Parallax Workshop, St. Norbert Arts & Cultural Centre, Winnipeg, Manitoba, Canada.
1989 A 5th year architecture students thesis, traveling Brazil,The Institute for Architects of Brazil, Co-Curator with Larry Richards. University of Waterloo:  Co-op Laboratory
1986	Between Here & There: The Memory of Disruption - Archimemoria, SESC - Fabrica da Pompeia Art Gallery,São Paulo.

Selected recent group exhibitions
2006	La Panera, Lleida, Spain.
2006	Koldo, San Sebastian, Spain.
2003	Alucine, Toronto, Ontario, Canada
2003	Fundació Tàpies, Barcelona, Spain.
2002	The Mendel Public Art Gallery, Saskatoon, Saskatchewan, Canada.
2001	SESC Fabrica da Pompeia, São Paulo, Brazil.

Publications
2010	"Architecture Parallax : The Blind Architect Meets Rembrandt", http://www.mcmaster.ca/museum/.
2008	"Architecture Parallax : The Blind Architect", Lulu.com International.
2008	"Architecture Parallax : São Paulo", Lulu.com International.
2008	"Architecture Parallax : São Paulo - Maddest About You", Lulu.com International.
2006	Centro Cultural Koldo Mitxelena, San Sebastian, Spain.
2006	Centre d'Art La Panera, Lleida, Spain.
2006    "São Paulo, Memory of Disruption", an edition of 80 issues. (published by Pinacoteca do Estado de São Paulo with a Canada Council Grant.)
2004	"What you See is not What you are Thinking you are Seeing", Tàpies Fundació, Barcelona Spain.
1998	Architektur - Parallaxe : Turm Tisch Ture, I.F.A., Stuttgart Germany.
1998	Architecture Parallax : Scopic Flash Guernsey Gallery G. Britain.
1996	"Parallax History, Akademie Schloss Solitude, Stuttgart Germany.
1995	Architecture-Parallax : SnackLunch, St. Norbert Cultural & Art Centre Winnipeg.
1995	Parallax : The Legacy of the Future is the Burden of the Past, Museo del Chopo Mexico DF, Mexico.
1995	View - Bi Occulus, Akademie Schloss Solitude, Stuttgart Germany.
1994	Architecture Body Parallax, Winnipeg Art Gallery, Winnipeg.
1990	Architecture Ultra Mundane, published by the Museo de Arte Moderna S.P.
1989	G-7:  Architecture Snack Lunch, The Power Plant Art Gallery, Toronto.
1988	Architecture X-ray, New Observations, VOL. 55, New York
1986	Entre Espaço : A Memoria da Disruptura'', Archimemoria Canada.

References

External links
Peak Gallery contemporary art
architecture parallax : visual crisis - the blind architect
Architecture Parallax - Mediateca
Biografie Alexander Pilis 
Alexander Pilis - Guernsey.net
Alexander PILIS

Brazilian architects
Living people
Year of birth missing (living people)